Dorothy Byrne is a Scottish journalist, television executive and academic. She is the current President of Murray Edwards College, Cambridge. Prior to this, she was Editor at Large at Channel 4 Television, where she previously served as Head of News and Current Affairs.

Background 
Byrne was born in Paisley, Scotland, the daughter of Charles and Agnes Byrne. She was educated at Layton Hill Convent, Blackpool. She studied philosophy at Manchester University (BA Hons) and business studies at Sheffield University (Diploma).

Professional career 

Byrne was producer of World in Action (ITV), 1992–95, and editor of The Big Story (ITV), 1995–98. In 1998 she was appointed Commissioning Editor of Current Affairs and editor of Dispatches at Channel 4. In 2003 she was appointed Head of News and Current Affairs at Channel 4. She stepped down in 2020 and was appointed Editor-at-Large of Channel 4 Television.

From 2005 to 2016, she was a visiting professor at the School of Journalism of the University of Lincoln. Since 2016, she has been a visiting professor at De Montfort University. In 2019, she delivered both The MacTaggart Lecture at The Edinburgh Television Festival and the Cockcroft Rutherford Lecture at the University of Manchester. In 2020, she was a visiting fellow at the Reuters Institute for the Study of Journalism, University of Oxford.

In December 2020, Byrne was elected the sixth president of Murray Edwards College, Cambridge. She took up the appointment on 17 September 2021, following the retirement of Dame Barbara Stocking.

In October 2021 Byrne was awarded an honorary doctorate from her alma mater, The University of Manchester.

Ahmadinejad's alternative Christmas message 

In a statement in December 2008, Byrne defended Channel 4's invitation to Mahmoud Ahmadinejad, the Iranian President, to deliver the channel's "alternative Christmas message": "As the leader of one of the most powerful states in the Middle East, President Ahmadinejad's views are enormously influential. ... we are offering our viewers an insight into an alternative world view". Israel's ambassador to Great Britain, Ron Prosor, said: "In Iran, converts to Christianity face the death penalty. It is perverse that this despot is allowed to speculate on the views of Jesus, while his government leads Christ's followers to the gallows."

References

1953 births
Living people
Alumni of the University of Manchester
Alumni of the University of Sheffield
Scottish people of Irish descent
Channel 4 people
People from Blackpool
Presidents of Murray Edwards College, Cambridge
Scottish television executives
Scottish journalists
Scottish women academics
Date of birth missing (living people)
People from Paisley, Renfrewshire